Mark R. Peattie (May 3, 1930 in Nice, France – January 22, 2014 in San Rafael, California) was an American academic and Japanologist.  Peattie was a specialist in modern Japanese military, naval, and imperial history.

Career
Peattie was a professor emeritus at the University of Massachusetts Boston and a research fellow at Stanford University's Hoover Institution.  He was a visiting professor at the University of Hawaii in 1995.

Peattie was a reader for Columbia University Press, University of California Press, University of Hawaii Press, Stanford University Press, University of Michigan Press, and the U.S. Naval Institute Press.

Select works
 2002 – Sunburst: The Rise of Japanese Naval Air Power, 1909-1941
 1998 – Nan'yō: the Rise and Fall of the Japanese in Micronesia, 1885-1945. Honolulu : University of Hawaii Press. ; 
 1997 – Kaigun: Strategy, Tactics, and Technology in the Imperial Japanese Navy, 1887-1941 (with David C. Evans). Annapolis, Maryland: U.S. Naval Institute Press.
 1996 – The Japanese Wartime Empire, 1931-1945 (with Peter Duus and Ramon H. Myers). Princeton: Princeton University Press.
 1975 – Ishiwara Kanji and Japan's Confrontation with the West.

References

External links
 Cohen, Eliot A. "Review: Kaigun: Strategy, Tactics, and Technology in the Imperial Japanese Navy, 1887-1941", Foreign Affairs. May/Jun 1998.

1930 births
2014 deaths
American military historians
American male non-fiction writers
University of Hawaiʻi faculty
American Japanologists
Hoover Institution people
University of Massachusetts Boston faculty